Parnassius huberi  is a high-altitude butterfly which is found in Tibet. It is a member of the snow Apollo genus (Parnassius) of the swallowtail family (Papilionidae).

P. huberi is a newly discovered Parnassius species closely related to  P. acco and P. schultei.

References
 Paulus, V. 1999. A new species of Parnassius discovered in North Tibet, China. Wallace, 6: 2–7.

External links
Parnassius of the World - photograph and map

huberi
Butterflies described in 1999